Karl Florian Goebel (18 October 1972 — 10 September 2008) was a German astrophysicist attached to the Max Planck Institute for Physics in Munich. He had also been a member of DESY, a German-based research center that develops and runs several particle accelerators and detectors, most notably the ZEUS project.

At the time of his death he was managing the MAGIC-II telescope project. His death led to the suspension of the official inauguration date for MAGIC-II, originally set for 19 September 2008.

Education and career
Goebel graduated from Heidelberg University in July 1995 with an undergraduate degree in Physics. As a recipient of a Fulbright scholarship, he earned his master's degree in Physics from Stony Brook University, the first degree awarded from work with the Stony Brook Nucleon decay and Neutrino Group's participation in the Super-Kamiokande experiment, in December 1996. Goebel completed his PhD in Physics at the DESY in Hamburg in September 2001 as part of his work on the ZEUS project.

 In 2002, Goebel joined the Max Planck Institute for Physics's MAGIC project, becoming the project manager for MAGIC-II in 2005. MAGIC-II, the companion to the MAGIC (Major Atmospheric Gamma-ray Imaging Cherenkov) telescope, is situated 85 metres from its counterpart at the Roque de los Muchachos Observatory on La Palma, one of the Canary Islands.

Death and legacy
After his death, the pair of telescopes were renamed the "MAGIC Florian Goebel Telescopes" in his memory. MAGIC-II had its "first light" on 25 April 2009 after a ceremony during which Goebel's brother assisted with the ribbon-cutting.

Selected publications

References

External links 

German astrophysicists
2008 deaths
Accidental deaths from falls
Accidental deaths in Spain
1972 births
Fulbright alumni